State Route 307 (SR 307) is an east–west state highway in the northeastern portion of the U.S. state of Ohio.

SR 307 was commissioned in the mid-1930s and the route was swapped with another state route one year later. The route was extended in the later 1930s, to an intersection with SR 84. That section of road was decommission in the early 1960s.

Route description
SR 307 begins at a T-intersection with SR 528. The route heads east as a two-lane highway passing through farmland and woodland, with some houses. The highway has an intersection with SR 534. The road has an intersection with SR 45, in Austinburg. After Austinburg, SR 307 turns towards the southeast, still passing through farmland and woodland. The route enters Jefferson, passing through residential properties, before an intersection with SR 46. SR 46 and SR 307 head due south concurrent, into downtown Jefferson, passing through commercial and residential properties. After downtown Jefferson SR 307 leaves SR 46. SR 307 heads southeast leaving Jefferson, passing through woodland and farmland. The highway has an interchange with SR 11. SR 307 ends at a T-intersection in rural Ashtabula County. No segment of this highway is a part of the National Highway System.

History
SR 307 was original certified in 1933, it was routed between Madison and SR 45 along current State Route 84. In 1934 SR 307 swapped alignments with SR 84. Between 1962 and 1964, SR 307 between SR 84 and SR 528 was decommissioned.

Major intersections

References

External links

State Route 307 Endpoint Photos

307
Transportation in Lake County, Ohio
Transportation in Ashtabula County, Ohio